"Perfect Strangers" is a song by Australian band INXS released as the fourth single from their eleventh studio album Switch,  which was also the first album with lead singer J.D. Fortune, winner of the Rock Star: INXS competition. The single was released in 2006.

The song's music video was filmed at an INXS concert in Vancouver, Canada.

INXS songs
2006 singles
2005 songs
Song recordings produced by Guy Chambers
Epic Records singles
Songs written by Garry Gary Beers
Songs written by Graham Edwards (musician)
Songs written by Shelly Peiken
Songs written by Lauren Christy
Songs written by Scott Spock